Haruna Ramadhan Shamte (born 27 December 1988) is a Tanzanian football defender who plays for Simba.

References

1988 births
Living people
Tanzanian footballers
Tanzania international footballers
Simba S.C. players
JKT Ruvu Stars players
Mbeya City F.C. players
Lipuli F.C. players
Association football defenders
Tanzanian Premier League players